The humidex (short for humidity index) is an index number used by Canadian meteorologists to describe how hot the weather feels to the average person, by combining the effect of heat and humidity. The term humidex was coined in 1965. The humidex is a nominally dimensionless quantity (though generally recognized by the public as equivalent to the degree Celsius) based on the dew point.

Range of humidex: Scale of comfort:

 20 to 29: Little to no discomfort
 30 to 39: Some discomfort
 40 to 45: Great discomfort; avoid exertion
 Above 45: Dangerous; heat stroke quite possible

History 
The current formula for determining the humidex was developed by J. M. Masterton and F. A. Richardson of Canada's Atmospheric Environment Service in 1979. Humidex differs from the heat index used in the United States in being derived from the dew point rather than the relative humidity, though both dew point and relative humidity (when used in conjunction with air temperature) are directly related to atmospheric moisture.

For a long time, the record humidex in Canada was set by Windsor, Ontario, which hit 52.1 on 20 June 1953, as reported by Environment Canada.

This value was beaten on 25 July 2007 when Carman, Manitoba, hit 52.6.

Computation formula 
The humidex is higher than the U.S. heat index at equal temperature and relative humidity.

The humidex formula is as follows:

where
 H denotes the Humidex
 Tair is the air temperature in °C
 Tdew is the dewpoint temperature in °C
 e = 2.71828 is an approximation of Euler's number

5417.7530 is a rounded constant based on the molecular weight of water, latent heat of evaporation, and the universal gas constant. The humidity adjustment approximately amounts to one Fahrenheit degree for every millibar by which the partial pressure of water in the atmosphere exceeds .

At the time the humidex was originally developed in 1965, Canada was still on the Fahrenheit scale, and thus the humidex was originally based on that. The 1979 reformulation, which added the 0.5555 factor, was largely to address metrication in Canada as the country switched to the Celsius scale.

Table

See also 
 Heat index (with temperature chart in both °F and °C)
 AccuWeather RealFeel temperature
 Thermal stress on humans
 Wind chill

References 

Atmospheric thermodynamics
1979 introductions
Climate of Canada
Meteorological indices